Leeke is a surname. It may refer to:
Alicia Leeke (b. ?), U.S. painter and artist
Edward Tucker Leeke (1842–1925), British clergyman and scholar
Ferdinand Leeke (1859–1923), German painter
George Leeke (died 1939), Irish nationalist politician
Henry Alan Leeke (1879–1915), British track and field athlete and Olympic competitor
Henry John Leeke (1794–1870), British Royal Naval officer
Henry Leeke (athlete) ( – 1922), British amateur athlete, and Olympic competitor
John Leeke (1843–1919), British Anglican bishop
Newton Leeke (1854–1933), British Anglican bishop
Samuel Leeke (died 1775), British magistrate, land owner, and deputy lieutenant
Thomas Leeke Massie (1802–1898), British officer of the Royal Navy
William Leeke (1797–1879), British army officer and clergyman

See also